Beamerella is a valid genus of chiggers.

Beamerella may also refer to:

 Beamerella, a genus of leafhoppers now regarded as a synonym of Beamerana 
 Beamerella, a genus of true bugs now regarded as a synonym of Larinocerus